The Harod Stream ,  is a stream in Israel that flows west to east, from the Givat HaMoreh area via the Harod Valley and Beit She'an Valley into the Jordan River, about  north of Ma'oz Haim. It is the main drainage route of the Harod Valley

While the original sources of the water are karst springs, most of the stream's water comes from the discharge of numerous fish ponds, irrigation systems, and sewage. Rain floods are rare, and the upper flow of the stream is dry during most of the time. The network of the stream and its tributaries is mostly man-made, and natural riverbeds are preserved at the southern steep slopes of the valley.

Places of interest
; 
Ma'ayan Harod
Beit She'an National Park
Highway 71 (Israel)

References

Rivers of Israel